Minsk Cycling Club is a UCI Women's Continental Team founded in 2017 and based in Belarus.

After the 2022 Russian invasion of Ukraine, the UCI said that Belarusian teams are forbidden from competing in international events.

Team roster

Major results
2018
Stage 3 Tour of Eftalia Hotels & Velo Alanya, Karalina Savenka
Team classification Panorama Guizhou International Women's Road Cycling Race
2019
Grand Prix Gazipasa, Ina Savenka
Grand Prix Alanya, Tatsiana Sharakova
2020
Stage 3 Dubai Women's Tour, Tatsiana Sharakova
Grand Prix Manavgat–Side, Hanna Tserah

National champions
2017
 Belarus Time Trial, Tatsiana Sharakova
 Belarus Road Race, Tatsiana Sharakova
 Belarus Track (Team sprint), Kristina Bialetskaya
 Belarus Track (Individual sprint), Tatsiana Sharakova
 Belarus Track (Points race), Tatsiana Sharakova
 Belarus Track (Scratch race), Hanna Tserah
2018
 Belarus Track (Individual pursuit), Ina Savenka
 Belarus Track (Scratch race), Anastasiya Dzedzikava
 Belarus Time Trial, Tatsiana Sharakova
2019
 Belarus Time Trial, Tatsiana Sharakova
 Belarus Road Race, Tatsiana Sharakova
2020
 Belarus Time Trial, Tatsiana Sharakova
 Belarus Road Race, Tatsiana Sharakova
 Belarus Track (Team pursuit), Darya Dziakola
 Belarus Track (Team pursuit), Taisa Naskovich
 Belarus Track (Team sprint), Darya Dziakola
 Belarus Track (Team sprint), Taisa Naskovich
2021
 Belarus Time Trial, Tatsiana Sharakova
 Belarus Road Race, Tatsiana Sharakova

References

External links

UCI Women's Teams
Cycling teams based in Belarus
Cycling teams established in 2017
2017 establishments in Belarus